Nemanja Petrović (born 17 April 1992) is a Serbian professional footballer, playing for FK TSC Bačka Topola.

Club career

Partizan

2013–14 season
On 11 July 2013, Petrović signed a four-year contract with Partizan. His squad number was confirmed as 5, replacing Žarko Tomašević who moved to Kortrijk soon before Nemanja Petrović arrival. He was first in the protocol for Partizan in a Second qualifying round for UEFA Champions League against Armenian club Shirak on 17 July 2013. He made his debut for the club in a UEFA Europa League qualifier against Swiss club Thun on 22 August 2013. Petrović scored his first official goal for Partizan on 20 October 2013 against Jagodina.

During the spring part of the season, Petrovic has played only one match, against Javor Matis and has been on the bench three times. In the 2014–15 season, Petrovic has played a total of 12 appearances for Partizan, scoring one goal and enrolled one assist.

2014–15 season
Petrović made his first appearance of the 2014–15 season on 15 July against HB Torshavn in Second qualifying round for UEFA Champions League. He also played 2 matches in Play-off of 2014–15 UEFA Europa League against Neftchi.
On 28 August 2014, Petrović and his team enters the group stage of the UEFA Europa League, after of victory over the Azerbaijanian club Neftchi. On 18 September 2014 Partizan has played against Tottenham Hotspur, in 54 minutes into the game Vladimir Volkov complained of a violation and Petrovic entered the game and enrolled his first appearance in the group stage of a some European competition. He is in all other matches in the Europa League been on the bench except in the last game in the group stage where Petrović played against Greek club Asteras Tripolis. Petrović is played against Asteras at right back all 90 minutes.

International career
Petrović made his debut for the Serbian national under-21 team under manager Radovan Ćurčić in 2013. He was a member of the team at the 2015 UEFA Under-21 Championship.

Petrović made his debut for Serbia national football team on 25 January 2023 in a friendly match against USA. Serbia won the game 2 – 1, him Lučić being a starter.

Career statistics

International

Honours
Partizan
 Serbian SuperLiga: 2014–15

Notes and references

External links
 
 

1992 births
Living people
Serbian footballers
Serbian expatriate footballers
Association football defenders
Sportspeople from Valjevo
Serbia under-21 international footballers
Serbia international footballers
FK Teleoptik players
FK Partizan players
FK Napredak Kruševac players
Maccabi Netanya F.C. players
FK Rad players
G.D. Chaves players
FK TSC Bačka Topola players
Serbian First League players
Serbian SuperLiga players
Israeli Premier League players
Primeira Liga players
Expatriate footballers in Israel
Expatriate footballers in Portugal
Serbian expatriate sportspeople in Israel
Serbian expatriate sportspeople in Portugal